Larceny is an implementation of the Scheme programming language built around the Twobit optimizing compiler. Larceny offers several back-ends able to target native x86 and ARMv7 code.  Petit Larceny is also available and emits C source code, which can then be further compiled to native code with an ordinary C compiler.

Older versions (<0.98) included support for the SPARC architecture in Larceny, and for Microsoft's Common Language Runtime via Common Larceny.

Larceny supports all major Scheme standards (R5RS, IEEE/ANSI, R6RS, and R7RS.  The Larceny software is open source and available online.

References

External links
 

Scheme (programming language) compilers
Scheme (programming language) interpreters
Scheme (programming language) implementations
R6RS Scheme
Free compilers and interpreters